Martinus "Martin" Lippens (8 October 1934 – 2 November 2016) was a Belgian international football player  and trainer who only played for one club, Sporting Anderlecht, as a midfielder.

He played for Anderlecht in the entire 1950s; seven times he took home the Belgian Championship with the Mauves, and once he also won the Belgian Cup. He played 232 official matches in the first division for that club, and appeared 33 times in the national selection. After his player career was head coach for different clubs for short periods, but mainly worked as youth trainer or assistant-coach.

Player palmares

Club career 
Anderlecht
 Belgian First Division (7): 1954–55, 1955–56, 1958–59, 1961–62, 1963–64, 1964–65, 1965–66
Belgian Cup (1): 1964–65

International career 
 33 selections for the Belgium national team and 2 goals

References

External links
 

1934 births
2016 deaths
Belgian footballers
R.S.C. Anderlecht players
Belgium international footballers
Belgian Pro League players
Footballers from Brussels

Association football midfielders